Alexander Mitchell Beattie (often misspelled Beatty) (July 29, 1828 – March 7, 1907) was an American soldier who received the Medal of Honor for valor during the American Civil War.

Biography
Beatty served in the American Civil War in the 3rd Vermont Infantry for the Union Army from June 1861 until July 1864. He received the Medal of Honor on April 25, 1894, for his actions at the Battle of Cold Harbor.  Captain Beattie was a companion of the Vermont Commandery of the Military Order of the Loyal Legion of the United States.

Medal of Honor citation
Citation:

Removed, under a hot fire, a wounded member of his command to a place of safety.

See also

List of American Civil War Medal of Honor recipients: A–F

References

External links
Military Times

1828 births
1907 deaths
Union Army officers
United States Army Medal of Honor recipients
People of Vermont in the American Civil War
American Civil War recipients of the Medal of Honor